The Nest is a 1980 Spanish drama film written and directed by Jaime de Armiñán, starring Héctor Alterio and Ana Torrent. The plot follows the emotionally intense relationship between an old widower and a precocious thirteen-year-old girl. The film was nominated for the Academy Award for Best Foreign Language Film at the 53rd Academy Awards.

Plot
In a small village near Salamanca, Alejandro, a rich 60-year-old widower falls in love with Goyita, a 13-year-old girl.

Cast
Héctor Alterio	- Don Alejandro
Ana Torrent	- Goyita
Luis Politti		- Don Eladio
Agustín González	- Sargento
Patricia Adriani	- Marisa
María Luisa Ponte	- Amparo
Mercedes Alonso	- Mercedes
Luisa Rodrigo	 	- Gumer
Amparo Baró	- Fuen
Ovidi Montllor	- Manuel

See also
 List of submissions to the 53rd Academy Awards for Best Foreign Language Film
 List of Spanish submissions for the Academy Award for Best Foreign Language Film

References

External links
 

1980 films
1980 drama films
Spanish drama films
1980s Spanish-language films
Films directed by Jaime de Armiñán
Films with screenplays by Jaime de Armiñán